L'Impromptu de Paris  (In English: The Shepherd of Paris) is a play written in 1937 by French dramatist Jean Giraudoux.

Original productions
 L'Impromptu de Paris  was first performed on 3 December 1937 in Paris at the Théâtre de l'Athénée in a production by Louis Jouvet.

L'Impromptu de Paris was translated into English by Rima Dell Reck, in the Tulane Drama Review (1959).

References

Plays by Jean Giraudoux
1930 plays